Syllepte hoenei is a moth in the family Crambidae. It was described by Aristide Caradja in 1925. It is found in China.

References

Moths described in 1925
hoenei
Moths of Asia